is a Japanese manga artist. Soda studied at Nihon University, but left prior to graduating. He worked as an assistant for Taku Kitazaki, and debuted in 1990 with GET ROCK, published in Magazine Special. His most notable series are Firefighter! Daigo of Fire Company M and Subaru.

In 1997 Soda won the Shogakukan Manga Award for Firefighter! Daigo of Fire Company M, and in 2005 he won the Kodansha Manga Award for Capeta.

Selected works
 Get Rock
  (about cycling, made into a 2008 film starring Yuichi Nakamura)
 Firefighter! Daigo of Fire Company M - published in Shonen Sunday
  published in Big Comic Spirits
 Capeta
 Moon: Subaru Solitude Standing published in Big Comic Spirits
  published in Big Comic Spirits

Art Books
 
 
 Capeta: The Guidebook

References

External links
 Masahito Soda's Home Page 
 

1968 births
Living people
People from Tokyo
Manga artists from Tokyo
Winner of Kodansha Manga Award (Shōnen)
Nihon University alumni